Frances Rich (born Irene Frances Lither Deffenbaugh; January 8, 1910 – October 14, 2007) was an American actress, artist, and sculptor. She was the daughter of actress Irene Rich.

Early life 
Frances Rich was born January 8, 1910, in Spokane, Washington, U.S., to silent screen actress Irene Frances Luther Rich and salesman Elvo Elcourt Deffenbaugh. Her step-father was Charles Rich, who adopted her when he married her mother.  Rich attended Smith College, from which she graduated in 1931.

Career

Acting
Rich made her film debut in Diamond Trail (1933), after which she acted in Zoo in Budapest (1933) and Pilgrimage (1933). She also appeared on Broadway in Brief Moment from November 1931 through February 1932.

Sculpting

Born in Spokane, Washington, Rich received a B.A. from Smith College in 1931. In 1933 she met sculptor, Malvina Hoffman, and studied with her in Paris for two years. Upon returning to America, she did intensive work at the Boston Museum School and established her own studio in New York City. Between 1937 and 1940 she was a resident student at Cranbrook Academy of Art. There she met sculptor Carl Milles, with whom she worked for the next eighteen years.

Her works include portrait busts at Smith College; the Army-Navy Nurse Monument in Arlington National Cemetery in Washington, D.C.; a bronze pelican in front of Pelican Building, University of California, Berkeley; marble bust of Alice Stone Blackwell for the Boston Public Library (featured on the Boston Women's Heritage Trail); and portrait busts of Lotte Lehmann, Margaret Sanger, Diego Rivera, Katharine Hepburn, among others.

Architectural sculpture by Rich includes six monumental limestone bas reliefs at the Purdue University student union building, executed in 1938.

Death
Rich died in Payson, Arizona, on October 14, 2007, aged 97.

References

External links

Biography from the American College of Greece (2004)
Frances Rich papers at the Sophia Smith Collection, Smith College Special Collections
Article from Madonna House
Obituary, Washington Post
Frances Rich arriving Burbanks Airport 1936 Christmas holidays; being greeted by her mother, Irene Rich

1910 births
2007 deaths
Cranbrook Academy of Art alumni
American film actresses
American stage actresses
American women sculptors
People from Gila County, Arizona
Actresses from Spokane, Washington
Artists from Spokane, Washington
Smith College alumni
20th-century American sculptors
20th-century American women artists
Sculptors from Washington (state)
20th-century American actresses
Artists of the Boston Public Library
21st-century American women